Minera Valparaíso (IPSA:MINERA) is a holding company engaged in the following activities as electric energy, pulp and paper, port administration, wood and many others, each sector is operated by a different subsidiary.

Holding companies of Chile
1906 establishments in Chile
Pulp and paper companies of Chile